In Greek mythology, the name Areithous (Ancient Greek: Ἀρηΐθοος) may refer to:

He is called in the Iliad the "club-bearer" (korynetes), because he fought with no other weapon but an iron club. He fell by the hand of Lycurgus of Arcadia, who drove him into a narrow defile, where he could not make use of his club. His armor was later worn by Lycurgus and then by Ereuthalion. The tomb of Areithous was shown in Arcadia as late as the time of Pausanias.
Areithous, a defender of Troy, squire and charioteer of the Thracian Rhigmus. Both Areithous and Rhigmus were killed by Achilles in the battle: he smote them with his spear.

The name is based on the adjective ἀρηΐθοος, meaning warlike, or literally "swift in the fight."

Notes

References 
 Homer, The Iliad with an English Translation by A.T. Murray, Ph.D. in two volumes. Cambridge, MA., Harvard University Press; London, William Heinemann, Ltd. 1924. . Online version at the Perseus Digital Library.
Homer, Homeri Opera in five volumes. Oxford, Oxford University Press. 1920. . Greek text available at the Perseus Digital Library.
 Pausanias, Description of Greece with an English Translation by W.H.S. Jones, Litt.D., and H.A. Ormerod, M.A., in 4 Volumes. Cambridge, MA, Harvard University Press; London, William Heinemann Ltd. 1918. . Online version at the Perseus Digital Library
Pausanias, Graeciae Descriptio. 3 vols. Leipzig, Teubner. 1903.  Greek text available at the Perseus Digital Library.

Trojans
Boeotian characters in Greek mythology